Kaipamangalam  is a village in Thrissur district in the state of Kerala, India. Kaipamangalam assembly segment consist of Edavilangu, Eriyad, Kaipamangalam, Mathilakam, Perinjanam and Sreenarayanapuram Panchayats in Kodungallur Taluk.

Demographics
 India census, Kaipamangalam had a population of 35626 with 16290 males and 19336 females.

Academic institutions
Kaipamangalam village has several government and aided educational institutions which includes high schools and higher secondary schools. Govt.Fisheries Vocational Higher Secondary school is one of the oldest such institutions, which celebrates its 100th year of foundation. It offers higher secondary courses in biology science, humanities, and commerce. It also has a vocational higher secondary program in aquaculture.

References

External links

Villages in Thrissur district